The United States National Boxing Championships bestow the title of United States Champion on Olympic boxers for winning the annual national Olympic boxing tournament organized by USA Boxing, which is the national governing body for Olympic boxing and is the United States' member organization of the International Boxing Federation.

USA Boxing comprises 56 Local Boxing Committees, which are currently grouped into 14 geographical regions (previously in 1970s and 1980s they were divided into 22 AAU regions represented in the national's, each carrying a team of 11 boxers, with each being a Region tournament winner.) These LBCs, along with the coaches, athletes, and officials, form the backbone of USA Boxing and Olympic-style boxing in the United States. USA Boxing's athlete membership comprises both male and female boxers.

The national Olympic boxing championships now sponsored by USA Boxing are titled United States National Boxing Championships and were formerly the AAU Boxing championship.

Current Weight classes
Light flyweight (106 pounds)
Flyweight (112 pounds)
Bantamweight (119 pounds)
Featherweight (125 pounds)
Lightweight (132 pounds)
Light welterweight (141 pounds)
Welterweight (152 pounds)
Middleweight (165 pounds) 
Light heavyweight (178 pounds)
Heavyweight (201 pounds)
Super heavyweight (+201 pounds)

US Amateur National Championships
Below are the lists of the sanctioned USA National Tournaments, by Jr and open division:

Jr. Division
National Silver Gloves
National Jr. Golden Gloves
National Jr. Olympics

Open Division
National USA Amateur Championships
National U-19 Amateur Championships
National Golden Gloves
National PAL Championships

US Champions
Below are the lists of the national champions, by division:
National Amateur Super Heavyweight Champions
National Amateur Heavyweight Champions
National Amateur Light Heavyweight Champions
National Amateur Middleweight Champions
National Amateur Light Middleweight Champions
National Amateur Welterweight Champions
National Amateur Light Welterweight Champions
National Amateur Lightweight Champions
National Amateur Featherweight Champions
National Amateur Bantamweight Champions
National Amateur Flyweight Champions
National Amateur Light Flyweight Champions

References